Choco Treasure was a candy created and distributed by Candy Treasure LLC in 2010. It is intended for children 3 years and over. It is a chocolate egg with a yellow capsule in the same way as Kinder Surprise only there's a seam around the yellow capsule, and the toys are different inside.

See also
 List of confectionery brands

References

External links

Products introduced in 2009
Chocolate-covered foods